Rochford Rural District was a rural district with an area of 146.01 square kilometres in the county of Essex, England. It was created in 1894, in 1897 the parish of Leigh was removed to create the Leigh-on-Sea Urban District. In 1926 the parish of Canvey Island was removed to create the Canvey Island Urban District. In 1929 the parishes of Hadleigh, South Benfleet and Thundersley were removed to create the Benfleet Urban District, at the same time the parishes of Rayleigh and Rawreth were removed to create the Rayleigh Urban District.

Since 1 April 1974 it has formed part of the District of Rochford.

At the time of its dissolution it consisted of the following 12 civil parishes.

Ashingdon
Barling Magna
Canewdon
Foulness
Stambridge
Great Wakering
Hawkwell
Hockley
Hullbridge
Paglesham
Rochford
Sutton

Political history of Essex
Districts of England abolished by the Local Government Act 1972
Districts of England created by the Local Government Act 1894
Rural districts of England